Akwa Boni (died c. 1790), was a sovereign Queen of the Baoulé people. The niece of Queen Pokou, she inherited the throne in around 1760 and ruled until her death in about 1790. She expanded the territory of the Baoulé, crossing the Bandama River and into the central Ivory Coast. In order to cross the river, one story has it that she needed to sacrifice her son to the river god; in doing so she gave her people their name, bauli, meaning 'the son is dead'. (Other versions of the story associate the incident with her aunt Queen Pokou.)

References

History of Ivory Coast
Women rulers in Africa
18th-century women rulers
1708 births
1790 deaths
Year of death uncertain
African queens